Phasmaviridae is a family of viruses with negative stranded RNA genomes associated with insect hosts. They are a member of the order Bunyavirales. Phasmaviruses were first discovered in phantom midges of the genus Chaoborus in 2014.

Taxonomy
The family contains the following six genera:
 Feravirus
 Hymovirus
 Jonvirus
 Orthophasmavirus
 Sawastrivirus
 Wuhivirus

Ferak feravirus
Ferak feravirus, a member of the genus Feravirus, has been isolated in cell culture. The virion is enveloped and spherical with a diameter of 80–120 nanometers. The genome has three segments L (6.8 kilobases), M (4.2 kilobases) and S (1.5 kilobases). It encodes five proteins—the polymerase on the L segment, the p12G and the Gc-Gn protein on the M segment and the N and p12 proteins in the S segment.

A Gn–Gc glycoprotein dimer binds to the cell receptor. The virus is endocytosed and escapes into the cytoplasm where it replicates. It is released from the cell by budding.

References

External links
 Viral zone 
 Virus Pathogen Database and Analysis Resource (ViPR): Bunyavirales

Bunyavirales
Virus families